The Desha County Courthouse, on Robert S. Moore Avenue in Arkansas City, Arkansas, is the county seat of Desha County.  The -story Romanesque Revival brick building was built in 1900 to a design by Little Rock architect Rome Harding.  Its most distinctive feature is its four-story square tower, which features doubled rectangular windows on the first level, a round-arch window on the second, an open round arch on the third, and clock faces on the fourth level.  The tower is topped by a pyramidal roof with finial.

The building was listed on the National Register of Historic Places in 1976.

See also
National Register of Historic Places listings in Desha County, Arkansas

References

Courthouses on the National Register of Historic Places in Arkansas
Romanesque Revival architecture in Arkansas
Government buildings completed in 1900
Buildings and structures in Desha County, Arkansas
National Register of Historic Places in Desha County, Arkansas
Courthouses in Arkansas